The Merton model, 
developed by Robert C. Merton in 1974, is a widely used "structural" credit risk model. 
Analysts and investors utilize the Merton model to understand how capable a company is at meeting financial obligations, servicing its debt, and weighing the general possibility that it will go into credit default.

Under this model, the value of stock equity is modeled as a call option on the value of the whole company – i.e. including the liabilities – struck at the nominal value of the liabilities; 
and the equity market value thus depends on the volatility of the market value of the company assets. 
The idea applied is that, in general, equity may be viewed as a call option on the firm: 
since the principle of limited liability protects equity investors, shareholders would choose not to repay the firm's debt where the value of the firm is less than the value of the outstanding debt; where firm value is greater than debt value, the shareholders would choose to repay – i.e. exercise their option – and not to liquidate.

This is the first example of a "structural model", where bankruptcy is modeled using a microeconomic model of the firm's capital structure. Structural models are distinct from "reduced form models" – such as Jarrow–Turnbull – where bankruptcy is modeled as a statistical process. 
By contrast, the Merton model treats bankruptcy as a continuous probability of default, where, on the random occurrence of default, the stock price of the defaulting company is assumed to go to zero. 
This microeconomic approach, to some extent, allows us to answer the question "what are the economic causes of default?"

See also 
 
 Credit default swap
 Credit derivatives
 Credit risk
 
 Jarrow–Turnbull model
 Probability of default

References

Further reading
 
 
 
 

Financial risk modeling
Financial_models
Credit risk
Equity securities